Cork North-East was a parliamentary constituency represented in Dáil Éireann, the lower house of the Irish parliament or Oireachtas from 1961 to 1981. The constituency elected 5 deputies (Teachtaí Dála, commonly known as TDs) to the Dáil until 1969, and then 4 thereafter. The method of election was proportional representation by means of the single transferable vote (PR-STV).

History 
The constituency was created under the Electoral (Amendment) Act 1961, for the 1961 general election to Dáil Éireann. The constituency returned 5 deputies from 1961 to 1969. Under the Electoral (Amendment) Act 1969 this was reduced to 4 seats from 1969 onwards.

It was abolished under the Electoral (Amendment) Act 1980, when it was partially replaced by the new constituencies of Cork East and Cork North-West.

Boundaries 
The district electoral divisions of the former Rural District of Fermoy; former rural district of Kanturk; former rural district of Mallow; former rural district of Midleton; former rural district of Mitchelstown No. 1; former rural district of Youghal; and the urban districts of Cobh, Fermoy, Mallow, Midleton and Youghal.

TDs

Elections

1979 by-election 
Following the death of Fianna Fáil TD Seán Brosnan, a by-election was held on 7 November 1979. The seat was won by the Fine Gael candidate Myra Barry.

1977 general election

1974 by-election 
Following the death of Fianna Fáil TD Liam Ahern, a by-election was held on 13 November 1974. The seat was won by the Fianna Fáil candidate Seán Brosnan.

1973 general election

1969 general election

1965 general election

1961 general election

See also 
Dáil constituencies
Politics of the Republic of Ireland
Historic Dáil constituencies
Elections in the Republic of Ireland

References

External links 
Oireachtas Members Database

Dáil constituencies in the Republic of Ireland (historic)
Historic constituencies in County Cork
1961 establishments in Ireland
1981 disestablishments in Ireland
Constituencies established in 1961
Constituencies disestablished in 1981